Fusion splicing is the act of joining two optical fibers end-to-end. The goal is to fuse the two fibers together in such a way that light passing through the fibers is not scattered or reflected back by the splice, and so that the splice and the region surrounding it are almost as strong as the intact fiber. The source of heat used to melt and fuse the two glass fibers being spliced is usually an electric arc, but can also be a laser, a gas flame, or a tungsten filament through which current is passed.

Governing standards
ANSI/EIA/TIA-455

See also
 Optical splice
 Single mode optical fiber
 Multi-mode optical fiber
 Fiber optic communication
 Optical fiber connector

References

Methods of Removing Matrix from Fiber Optic Cable" Patent 7,125,494

Further reading

 "How to Precision Clean All Fiber Optic Connections":  Edward J. Forrest, Jr.  
 Fiber Optic Association

Industrial processes
Fiber optics
Glass production
Articles containing video clips